The 1936 Saint Anselm Hawks football team was an American football team that represented Saint Anselm College as an independent during the 1936 college football season. Under second-year head coach Cleo A. O'Donnell, the team compiled a 6–0–1 record, shut out five of seven opponents, allowed opponents to score only two safeties, and outscored opponents by a total of 137 to 4.

Schedule

References

Saint Anselm
Saint Anselm Hawks football seasons
College football undefeated seasons
Saint Anselm football